Kansas's 1st Senate district is one of 40 districts in the Kansas Senate. It has been represented by Independent Dennis Pyle since 2005.

Geography
District 1 is based in the northeastern corner of the state, covering all of Atchison, Brown, Doniphan, Jackson, Marshall, Nemaha, and Pottawatomie Counties. Communities in the district include Atchison, Holton, Hiawatha, Sabetha, Seneca, Horton, Wathena, Troy, Elwood, and a small part of Manhattan.

The district overlaps with Kansas's 1st and 2nd congressional districts, and with the 51st, 61st, 62nd, 63rd, and 106th districts of the Kansas House of Representatives. It borders the states of Missouri and Nebraska.

Recent election results

2020

2016

2012

Federal and statewide results in District 1

References

1
Atchison County, Kansas
Brown County, Kansas
Doniphan County, Kansas
Jackson County, Kansas
Marshall County, Kansas
Nemaha County, Kansas
Pottawatomie County, Kansas